Lithocholic acid, also known as 3α-hydroxy-5β-cholan-24-oic acid or LCA, is a bile acid that acts as a detergent to solubilize fats for absorption. Bacterial action in the colon produces LCA from chenodeoxycholic acid by reduction of the hydroxyl functional group at carbon-7 in the "B" ring of the steroid framework.

It has been implicated in human and experimental animal carcinogenesis. Preliminary in vitro research suggests that LCA selectively kills neuroblastoma cells, while sparing normal neuronal cells and is cytotoxic to numerous other malignant cell types at physiologically relevant concentrations.

Dietary fiber can bind to lithocholic acid and aid in its excretion in stool; as such, fiber can protect against colon cancer.

LCA (and LCA acetate and LCA propionate) can activate the vitamin D receptor without raising calcium levels as much as vitamin D itself.

LCA binds with high affinity (20 μM) to the human membrane enzyme NAPE-PLD, enhancing dimer assembly and enabling catalysis. NAPE-PLD catalyzes the release of anandamide and other N-acylethanolamines (NAE) from the membrane precursor N-acyl-phosphatidylethanolamine(NAPE). NAPE-PLD facilitates crosstalk between bile acid signals and lipid amide signals. 

LCA was also shown to have anti-aging effects in a yeast study. A later study showed that the bile acid accumulates in the inner and outer mitochondrial membranes, altering the mitochondria's lipid composition by promoting or inhibiting various enzymes.

References

Bile acids
Secondary alcohols
Cholanes